Gatika is a town and municipality located in the province of Biscay, in the autonomous community of Basque Country, northern Spain. As of 2009, it has 1,559 inhabitants.
The historic Butrón castle is located in Gatika.

References

External links
 GATIKA in the Bernardo Estornés Lasa - Auñamendi Encyclopedia (Euskomedia Fundazioa) 

Municipalities in Biscay